Wellington is a statutory town in Larimer County, Colorado, United States.  The population was 11,047 at the 2020 census.

Geography
Wellington is located at  (40.702324, -105.005497).

Wellington is I-25's northernmost Colorado town.

Demographics

As of the census of 2000, there were 2,672 people, 932 households, and 693 families residing in the town. The racial makeup of the town was 87.39% White, 0.26% African American, 1.05% Native American, 0.67% Asian, 0.07% Pacific Islander, 8.23% from other races, and 2.32% from two or more races. Hispanic or Latino of any race were 12.13% of the population.

There were 932 households, out of which 46.4% had children under the age of 18 living with them, 61.1% were married couples living together, 8.8% had a female householder with no husband present, and 25.6% were non-families. 17.5% of all households were made up of individuals, and 4.2% had someone living alone who was 65 years of age or older.  The average household size was 2.86 and the average family size was 3.27.

In the town, the population was spread out, with 32.7% under the age of 18, 7.6% from 18 to 24, 38.2% from 25 to 44, 16.5% from 45 to 64, and 5.1% who were 65 years of age or older.  The median age was 30 years. For every 100 females, there were 99.7 males.  For every 100 females age 18 and over, there were 101.0 males.

The median income for a household in the town was $47,917, and the median income for a family was $48,214. Males had a median income of $34,107 versus $25,991 for females. The per capita income for the town was $17,783.  About 5.1% of families and 7.3% of the population were below the poverty line, including 8.4% of those under age 18 and 13.4% of those age 65 or over.

As of 2013, 6,725 people live in Wellington.

Law and government

Wellington is a statutory town regulated by the state statutes listed in the Colorado Revised Statutes. The board of trustees may approve ordinances that pertain to local issues.

The legislative authority of the town shall be vested in a board of trustees, consisting of 1 mayor and 6 trustees. The members of the board of trustees are elected for 4-year terms and are elected at large. The mayor is elected separately.

History
Founded in 1902, incorporated in 1905, and named for C. L. Wellington (an employee of the Colorado and Southern Railroad). U.S. Supreme Court Justice Byron White lived in Wellington as a child. He made a point of returning to Wellington on an annual basis for his high school reunions up until 1999 when his physical health worsened significantly.

In the early 20th century, especially during the years of prohibition, Wellington doubled as a place to drink and a service town for drivers commuting from Cheyenne to Fort Collins and vice versa. The town, more or less, sustained a population of 500 throughout the century which proceeded to build homes, restaurants, churches, and various other elements of small-town life.

In 2000, woolly mammoth remains were discovered by a construction crew while digging home foundations. Colorado State University sent a team to carefully excavate and preserve the bones of the extinct animals; Wellington residents watched attentively. Unfortunately, upon hoisting the remains out of the excavation site the tusks crumbled inside of the protective forms that were previously built around them.  Rear molars and parts of the skull of the mammoth are housed at CSU after being donated by the Burrus family (the developers of the project), who also kept molars of the animal. The subdivision where the bones were found named one of its streets in remembrance of the excitement.

Though population remained steady throughout the 20th century, Wellington experienced moderate growth in the 1990s and 2000s, rendering it a sort of bedroom community for the city of Fort Collins, which lies 10 miles to the South.

Culture
The town hosts an annual Fourth of July celebration which usually comprises a pancake breakfast, a parade, a subsequent car show, live music in the park, and fireworks at dusk.

Some residents enjoy biking around the vast spaces north of the town; at night, avid stargazers bring their telescopes to marvel at the universe.

The town's welcome signs call Wellington "a great place to grow."  Recently, Wellington held a competition to determine Wellington's 'brand'. Wellington's new brand was determined to be "Colorado's Northern Gateway", signifying that Wellington is the last major town headed north along I-25 towards Wyoming, and the first headed south towards Fort Collins.

Education
Wellington is home to three schools: Rice Elementary, Eyestone Elementary and Wellington Middle-High School, all part of Poudre School District. The former Wellington Middle School was honored with many national and state awards including:
 National "School to Watch", 2012–2015
 United States Department of Education National Green Ribbon School
 A.V.I.D International Demonstration School, 2013–2016
 Colorado Environmental Leadership Bronze Medal Award Winner, 2012
 National Yearbook Program of the Year, 2012, 2013

See also

Outline of Colorado
Index of Colorado-related articles
State of Colorado
Colorado cities and towns
Colorado municipalities
Colorado counties
Larimer County, Colorado
List of statistical areas in Colorado
Front Range Urban Corridor
North Central Colorado Urban Area
Fort Collins-Loveland, CO Metropolitan Statistical Area

References

External links
Town of Wellington website
CDOT map of the Town of Wellington

Towns in Larimer County, Colorado
Towns in Colorado
1902 establishments in Colorado